Redtop Mountain is a  mountain summit located in the Purcell Mountains of British Columbia, Canada. Nearby peaks include Truce Mountain,  to the west, Mount Earl Grey,  to the northeast, and Jumbo Mountain,  to the north. The first ascent of Redtop Mountain was made August 11, 1916, by Albert H. MacCarthy, Elizabeth MacCarthy, and Conrad Kain. Albert MacCarthy would go on to lead the 1925 first ascent of Mount Logan, Canada's highest mountain. The mountain's name was officially adopted June 9, 1960, when approved by the Geographical Names Board of Canada.


Climate
Based on the Köppen climate classification, Redtop Mountain is located in a subarctic climate zone with cold, snowy winters, and mild summers. Temperatures can drop below −20 °C with wind chill factors  below −30 °C. Precipitation runoff from the mountain drains southwest into Hamill Creek, a  tributary of the Duncan River, whereas most drains into tributaries of Toby Creek, which is a tributary of the Columbia River.

See also

Geography of British Columbia

References

External links
 Weather: Redtop Mountain
 Redtop Mountain aerial photo: PBase

Three-thousanders of British Columbia
Purcell Mountains
Columbia Country
Kootenay Land District